HNLMS Wambrau (A871) was a tugboat of the Royal Netherlands Navy (RNN). She served in the RNN between 1957 and 1987.

Construction 
Wambrau was laid down on 24 July 1956 and launched on 27 August 1956 at the Rijkswerf in Den Helder. The next year on 8 January 1957, she was commissioned into the Royal Netherlands Navy.

Service history 
In 1965 the HNLMS Holland collided with a freighter at sea and sustained severe damage, in response the Wambrau sailed immediately to the Holland to help with towing the destroyer back to Den Helder.

Notes

Citations

References

Tugboats of the Royal Netherlands Navy
1956 ships